The South Australian Ruby Awards, also known as the Ruby Awards, are annual awards which recognise outstanding achievement in South Australia’s arts and culture sector. They were named in honour of arts champion Dame Ruby Litchfield (1912–2001) .

History and description
The Ruby Awards were introduced in 2006 by the Government of South Australia, named in honour of the late arts patron Dame Ruby Litchfield. She was the first woman appointed to the Board of the Adelaide Festival Centre Trust, a founder member of Festival City Broadcasters, and a board member of numerous other organisations, including the Adelaide Festival of Arts, the South Australian Housing Trust and the Carclew Youth Performing Arts Centre.

The Awards were managed by Arts South Australia (formerly Arts SA) until 2018, when they were transferred to the Arts and Culture unit within the Department of the Premier and Cabinet.

Since the year of inception, they have grown in number from eight to twelve.

Winners

2006–2009

2010–2013

The Geoff Crowhurst Memorial Award was introduced in honour of actor and director Geoff Crowhurst (23 March 1951 – 4 July 2009).

2014–2017

2018–present
The 2018 South Australian Ruby Award significantly reshaped the award categories, including individual categories names in honour of the late Kaurna elder Stephen Goldsmith (the Stevie Gadlabarti Goldsmith Memorial Award for Aboriginal and Torres Strait Islander artistic and cultural achievement) and local arts icon Frank Ford (the Frank Ford Memorial Young Achiever Award), both of whom who died in the same year.

The Awards were held at the Queen's Theatre, Adelaide and the judging panel included eight key industry figures, including Heather Croall, Gavin Wanganeen and media personality Jane Doyle.

The 2019 Ruby Awards will be held at Queens Theatre on Friday 29 November. All winners receive a bespoke, ruby-coloured glasswork designed and made at the JamFactory, and a new prize for Premier's Award for Lifetime Achievement was established: a gold nameplate on a seat in the Festival Theatre. The People's Choice Award established in 2017 was not offered.

References

External links

Australian art awards
Australian theatre awards